The Czech Hockey Games, also sponsored as Carlson Hockey Games, is an annual ice hockey event held in Czech Republic. It is part of the Euro Hockey Tour. It was previously sponsored as the Pragobanka Cup,  Kajotbet Hockey Games and the Česká Pojišťovna Cup

History
The tournament started in 1994 as the Pragobanka Cup. In 1998, it became sponsored by Česká pojišťovna. In 2012, the tournament name was changed for two seasons when Kajotbet took over the sponsoring. In 2017, it became the Carlson Hockey Games. In the 1997–98 season, the tournament joined the Euro Hockey Tour and the Slovak national team was replaced with the Finnish national team.

From its start in 1994 until 2009, the tournament was always played between August and September. Since 2009, it has typically been played in April every year, with exceptions for the 2010 and 2014 Winter Olympics years, when the tournament is instead played in the August or September before the Olympics. The tournament was not moved prior to the 2018 Winter Olympics.

Prior to 2003, the tournament was played in Zlín at AC ZPS Zlín's home arena. It then moved to the Duhová Aréna in Pardubice, and then to the Tipsport Arena in Liberec, northern Bohemia, in 2005.

Results 
Final standings in each event are determined in a round-robin tournament. If teams are tied in points, the standing is determined by the result of the game between the tied teams.

Medal table

References 

 
Euro Hockey Tour
Ice hockey tournaments in Europe
International ice hockey competitions hosted by the Czech Republic
Sports competitions in Prague
Recurring sporting events established in 1994
1994 establishments in the Czech Republic